Overdue may refer to:

 Anything exceeding a time limit
 Overdue (album), a 1977 album by The Sandpipers
 "Overdue" (song), by Metro Boomin featuring Travis Scott
 "Overdue", a song by Muse on the album Showbiz
 "Overdue", a 2006 song by Bitter:Sweet on the album The Mating Game